Radoševac (Cyrillic script: Радошевац) may refer to:

Radoševac, a village in municipality of Babušnica, Serbia
Radoševac, a village in municipality of Golubac, Serbia

Serbo-Croatian place names